Dustin Armstrong  is an Australian curler. He is the only player from Western Australia in the line-up of the Australian men's team in the 2018 Pacific-Asia Curling Championships, the others originating Sydney or Melbourne.

Teams and events

References

External links
 

Living people
Australian male curlers

Year of birth missing (living people)
Sportspeople from Perth, Western Australia
Sportsmen from Western Australia